José Yañez (born 19 March 1932) is a Cuban wrestler. He competed in the men's freestyle lightweight at the 1960 Summer Olympics.

References

1932 births
Living people
Cuban male sport wrestlers
Olympic wrestlers of Cuba
Wrestlers at the 1960 Summer Olympics
Sportspeople from Havana
Pan American Games medalists in wrestling
Pan American Games bronze medalists for Cuba
Wrestlers at the 1955 Pan American Games
Wrestlers at the 1959 Pan American Games
20th-century Cuban people
21st-century Cuban people